Ashfield is a Transperth railway station located  north-east of Perth railway station, Western Australia, on the Midland line. It serves the suburb of Ashfield.

History
The station opened as a signal box named Cresco in 1930, with passenger facilities provided in 1954. The signal box remained until 1964.

Construction on a new 83 bay car park started in February 2020. The new car park was needed because 180 bays were permanently removed from Bayswater station in late 2020 due to the construction of the new Bayswater station. Since Ashfield station is in fare zone 2, and Bayswater station is in fare zone 1, catching the train into the city is more expensive from Ashfield. In order to offset the additional cost for passengers going to Ashfield station instead of Bayswater, the parking at Ashfield station is going to be free during the construction of the new Bayswater station. All other stations on the Transperth network have a $2 per day parking fee. The new carpark opened in October 2020.

Rail services
Ashfield railway station is served by the Midland railway line on the Transperth network. This line goes between Midland railway station and Perth railway station. Midland line trains stop at the station every 10 minutes during peak on weekdays, and every 15 minutes during the day outside peak every day of the year except Christmas Day. Trains are half-hourly or hourly at night time. The station saw 143,391 passengers in the 2013-14 financial year.

Bus routes

References

Midland line, Perth
Railway stations in Australia opened in 1954
Railway stations in Perth, Western Australia
Ashfield, Western Australia